This is a list of seasons played by Maidstone United in English football. It covers the period from the club's formation to the end of the last completed season. Where available it details the club's achievements in all competitions, together with the top scorers and the average attendances for each season.

Seasons

1993–2000
Information from 1993–2000 is scarce due to lack of available sources.

2000–present

Key

Division shown in bold to indicate a change in division.
Top scorer is for all competitive matches.
Average attendance is for all home league matches.

Key to league record:
 P = Played
 W = Games won
 D = Games drawn
 L = Games lost
 F = Goals for
 A = Goals against
 GD = Goal difference
 Pts = Points
 Pos = Final position

Key to divisions:
 NLP = National League
 NLS = National League South
 ILP = Isthmian League Premier Division
 ILS = Isthmian League Division One South
 KLP = Kent League Premier Division
 KCLP = Kent County League Premier Division
 KCL1 = Kent County League Division One
 KCL2 = Kent County League Division Two
 KCL4 = Kent County League Division Four

Key to rounds:
 dne = Did not enter
 PRE = Preliminary round
 1QR = 1st qualifying round
 2QR = 2nd qualifying round
 3QR = 3rd qualifying round
 4QR = 4th qualifying round
 R1 = Round 1
 R2 = Round 2
 QF = Quarter-finals
 SF = Semi-finals
 RU = Runners-up
 W = Winners

Notes

References

Maidstone United F.C.
Maidstone United